The 1992 Barber Saab Pro Series season was the seventh season of the series. Zerex continued to support the racing series. All drivers used Saab powered Goodyear shod Mondiale chassis. Swede Robert Amren won the championship.

Race calendar and results

Final standings

References

Barber Dodge Pro Series
1992 in American motorsport